Hor (also known as Abahor) and Susia (also known as Susanna) are martyrs of the Coptic Church.  They were martyred with their sons Hor and Agatho. Their feast day is October 5.

References
Holweck, F. G. A Biographical Dictionary of the Saint. St. Louis, MO: B. Herder Book Co. 1924.

Ante-Nicene Christian martyrs
Coptic Orthodox saints
Year of death missing
Year of birth missing
Ante-Nicene Christian female saints
Ancient African women